Dream Builders is an alternative education program in the city of Yorkton, Saskatchewan, Canada. Dream Builders is an accredited school that allows students to enroll and work around their lives while maintaining an education. Some students are referred to Dream Builders, while some choose to attend the school freely. Dream Builders offers grades 6 through 9. The second part of the school is much like High School with grades 10 through 12. The school is open to people under the age of 21, but students who enroll at the age of 20 are permitted to attend the school until their education is complete.

A second component to Dream Builders is the work experience component where students attend a class where they are taught work skills such as safe food handling and in the end they are set up with jobs.

Dream Builders is very open and willing to work around its students. Students who work can pick up their school work and drop it off. It is much like correspondence or "distance learning". Dream Builders allows young parents to attend the school and allows them to bring their children. The school also offers a free ride to school and a free lunch.

Dream Builders is backed by the Catholic School division and by Native Canadian teachings. The school has a spiritual and holistic component to it with several field trips that allow students to experience the culture and teachings of aboriginal people.

Dream Builders has the students and teachers addressing each other on a first name basis. The teachers also preach a no yelling policy as well as a drug-free policy.

Graduating students formerly had a ceremony at either the Yorkton Regional High School or Sacred Heart High School; Dream Builders began hosting its own graduation ceremony in 2007. Many of the students who have graduated from Dream Builders have gone on to post-secondary education.

References

High schools in Saskatchewan
Yorkton